The epithet the Unfortunate may refer to:

James II, Count of Urgell (1380–1433), also Viscount of Àger, and lord of Antillón, Alcolea de Cinca, and Fraga
James III of Majorca (1315–1349), King of Majorca from 1324 to 1344
Piero the Unfortunate (1472–1503), Gran maestro (unofficial head of state) of Florence from 1492 to 1494
Stephanie Alfonso of Castile (1139/114–1180), murdered by her husband

See also
List of people known as the Fortunate
List of people known as Lucky or the Lucky

Lists of people by epithet